Aydoslu Mehmed Pasha, also called Aidos Mehmed Pasha, was an 18th-century Ottoman statesman and military officer.

Aydoslyu Mehmed Pasha is best known for serving as the chief commander of the Izmail garrison during the Siege of Izmail in 1790 during the Russo-Turkish War of 1787–1792. He was captured by the Russians after the battle.

He later returned to Ottoman service, and in 1791 was appointed Beylerbey of the Rumelia Eyalet.

References 

 Russian armies captured a Turkish fortress Izmail (Yeltsin Presidential Library)

18th-century births
18th-century people from the Ottoman Empire
18th-century Ottoman military personnel
Civil servants from the Ottoman Empire
Pashas
Ottoman governors of Rumelia